is a Japanese competitor in synchronized swimming. She qualified for the 2020 Summer Olympics held in Tokyo, in the team event.

She competed in the 2019 FINA World Championships.

References

External links
 

1998 births
Living people
Japanese synchronized swimmers
Sportspeople from Saitama Prefecture
Hosei University alumni
Olympic synchronized swimmers of Japan
Synchronized swimmers at the 2020 Summer Olympics
World Aquatics Championships medalists in synchronised swimming
Artistic swimmers at the 2022 World Aquatics Championships
21st-century Japanese women